Scott Warner (born December 22, 1965) is a former professional tennis player from the United States.

Career
Warner attended the University of Nevada, Las Vegas and won the PCAA singles title in both 1986 and 1987. He earned All-American honors in 1987 when he made the quarter-finals of the NCAA Championships.

The American had his best year on tour in 1989. He made his Grand Prix debut at Key Biscayne and defeated Argentina's Martín Jaite in the first round, before being eliminated in the second round by Mats Wilander. At the 1989 OTB Open, Warner made it to the quarter-finals, his best showing in a Grand Prix tournament. He got through qualifying at the 1989 Wimbledon Championships to make his only appearance in the main singles draw of a Grand Slam event and lost in the opening round to Miloslav Mečíř. With partner David Pate, Warner won the men's doubles title at the 1989 Australian Indoor Championships. He also won two Challenger tournaments that year.

Grand Prix career finals

Doubles: 1 (1–0)

Challenger titles

Doubles: (2)

References

1965 births
Living people
American male tennis players
Tennis people from California
Sportspeople from Sacramento, California
Sportspeople from Hollywood, Florida
UNLV Rebels athletes
College men's tennis players in the United States